Vinaya Habosi (born 30 January 2000) is a Fijian rugby union player, currently playing for the . His preferred position is centre or wing.

Professional career
Habosi was named in the Fijian Drua squad for the 2022 Super Rugby Pacific season.

References

External links

2000 births
Living people
Fijian rugby union players
Rugby union centres
Rugby union wings
Fijian Drua players
Fiji international rugby union players